The Lugogo  River is a river of Uganda in eastern Africa. It is located in the central part of the country and flows in a south easterly direction from the Kabi River.

Rivers of Uganda